The enzyme cyanamide hydratase catalyzes the chemical reaction

urea  cyanamide + H2O

This enzyme belongs to the family of lyases, specifically the hydro-lyases, which cleave carbon-oxygen bonds.  The systematic name of this enzyme class is urea hydro-lyase (cyanamide-forming). This enzyme is also called urea hydro-lyase.  This enzyme participates in atrazine degradation.

References

 

EC 4.2.1
Enzymes of unknown structure